The Laboratory for Energy Conversion (LEC) formerly known as Turbomachinery Laboratory (LSM) was founded in 1892 by Aurel Boleslav Stodola. As part of the Federal Institute of Technology Zurich (ETH). The laboratory has been headed by some of the most prominent mechanical engineers in the history of turbomachinery.

Areas of research 
The current research projects at LEC cover the fields of:
 energy economics and policy
 performance and reliability of wind energy
 minimizing high-cycle fatigue failure of compressors
 efficiency improvements of turbomachines
 aircraft noise suppression
 cooling and thermal management
 laser produced plasma source (EUV) and debris mitigation
 development of a mobile power pack
 novel measurement techniques
 biomedical diagnostics

Awards 
Amongst many noted achievements, LEC has recently developed the FENT probe. This probe, for the first time, enables measurement of entropy generation in Turbomachinery. The highly rated peer-review journal Measurement Science and Technology recognised the development of this probe as the most outstanding contribution in the field of fluid mechanics in 2008.

Professors since 1892 
 1892 - 1929 Aurel Boleslav Stodola
 1929 - 1954 Henri Quiby
 1954 - 1983 Prof. Walter Traupel
 1983 - 1998 George Gyarmathy
 1998 -  Prof. Reza Abhari

Industry partners
 ABB Group, Switzerland
 BKW FMB Energie AG, Switzerland
 EOS Holding, Switzerland
 General Electric, US
 MAN Turbo AG, Switzerland
 Mitsubishi Heavy Industries, Japan
 MTU, Germany
 Siemens, US, Germany
 Swisselectric Research, Switzerland 
 Toshiba, Japan

See also
 Brown, Boveri & Cie
 Charles Algernon Parsons
 Gustaf de Laval

References

External links 
ETH Zurich
Laboratory for Energy Conversion
Adlyte
New Enterprise for Engineers

ETH Zurich
Mechanical engineering organizations
Turbines